Orlando Guerra (gayr'-rah; September 14, 1920 – March 20, 1973), better known as Cascarita, was a popular Cuban singer who specialized in guaracha and son montuno. He became one of Cuba's most famous vocalists as a member of Julio Cueva's big band and Orquesta Casino de la Playa in the 1940s.

Life and career

Early life and career 
Guerra was born on September 14, 1920 in Camagüey, the third-largest city of Cuba and the capital of Camagüey Province. Guerra started his professional career in his native Camagüey and Havana in the early 1940s, and made his name singing in highly successful big bands. In 1942 he joined Hermanos Palau. The same year he recorded with Pepito Torres' Orquesta Siboney in Puerto Rico, and in 1943 he and several other members of the Palau, spearheaded by Julio Cueva, founded a new big band with the arrangements of pianist René Hernández. After the departure of Miguelito Valdés, the lead singer of Orquesta Casino de la Playa, to New York in 1940, Cascarita became the main big band vocalist in Cuba. In Cueva's band, he was accompanied on vocals by René Márquez and Manuel "Puntillita" Licea. The owner of a highly personal style of vocalizing, he had an interesting sense of ease and graceful fluency to improvise, particularly interpreting guarachas, which gained him an important place in Cuban popular music history. He also became popular for his extravagant costumes and tangled sayings.

Casino de la Playa 
Cascarita continued to work with Julio Cueva until 1946, when he joined Orquesta Casino de la Playa. It was through his personal recommendation that Dámaso Pérez Prado obtained the job of arranger-pianist of the orchestra. Pérez Prado had been blacklisted in Cuba from working as an arranger because his charts were "too out there". He had gone about as far as he could working for Casino de la Playa, as Cascarita was more popular than the band. The records no longer came out under the title "Casino de la Playa, featuring Cascarita", but "Cascarita accompanied by Casino de la Playa".

Guerra recorded dozens of songs. Some of his greatest hits were "El baile del sillón", "El caballo y la montura", "Estoy acabando", "Llora timbero", "La ola marina", "La pelotica", "Piru, piru, pirulí", "Se murió Panchita", "Ta' bueno ya", "La última noche" and "Uampampiro", among others.

Later years and death 
With the advent of young successful singers such as Benny Moré, Cascarita lost much of his popularity, so he relocated to Mexico. There he joined pianist Memo Salamanca's orchestra. He died on March 20, 1973 in Mexico City at the age of 55. There are nonetheless conflicting accounts on his death. According to Juan José Reinosa he died in Panamá, while Helio Orovio maintains that he died in Mexico in 1975. In August 2008, Mexican writer Arturo Yáñez stated that he died in 1971 and that his remains can be found at the Panteón San Lorenzo in Tlaxcolco, Mexico.

Selected recordings
 Casino de la Playa
 Azúcar pa'un amargao'
 El baile del sillón
 El caballo y la montura
 Coge pa'la cola
 Esto es lo último
 Estoy acabando
 Llora
 La pelotica
 Quiero un sombrero
 Se murió Panchita
 Son los bobitos
 Tártara
 La última noche
 Un meneíto na'ma
 Yo pico un pan
Julio Cueva
 La butuba cubana
 Camisa sin botones
 Cerebro como plancha
 Con la comida no se juega
 El cuento del sapo
 Desintegrando
 El golpecito
 Figurina del solar
 No tengo tambó'
 Ñéngere ñéngue
 Pasito pa'lante
 Pin pin
 Piru, piru, pirulí
 La rareza del siglo
 Sabanimar
 Sacando boniato
 En tiempo de mangos
Hermanos Palau
 Acomodando
 Apriétame más
 La ola marina
 Mala maña
 Perro huevero 
 Puntillita
 Rosas del pensil
 Sácale punta al lápiz
 Ta' bueno ya
 Tú verá' lo que tú va' ve
 Uampampiro
 Yo estoy aprendiendo inglés
Pepito Torres
 Ladrón de gallinas
 Llora timbero
 Un brujo en Guanabacoa

References

External links
 

1920 births
1973 deaths
People from Camagüey
Singers from Mexico City
20th-century Cuban male singers
Guaracha singers
20th-century Mexican male singers
Cuban emigrants to Mexico